Candelaria Formation may refer to:
 Candelaria Formation, Nevada, Early Triassic geologic formation of Nevada
 Candelaria Formation, Argentina, Cambro-Ordovician geologic formation of Argentina
 Candelaria Formation, Colombia, Paleogene geologic formation of Colombia
 Candelária Formation, Amazon Basin, Quaternary geologic formation of Amazonian Brazil and Bolivia
 Candelária Formation, Paraná Basin, Late Triassic geologic formation of the Paraná Basin, Brazil